One Day in Europe is a 2005 film directed by Hannes Stöhr. The film was nominated for Golden Bear award at the 2005 Berlin Film Festival.

Plot
One Day in Europe consists of four stories about communication misunderstanding which take place on a single day in four cities (Berlin, Istanbul, Moscow and Santiago de Compostela). The Champions League match between Galatasaray and Deportivo La Coruña which takes place in Moscow on that particular day only worsens the problem.

The movie shows how four tourists in four places interact with the local police after being robbed or staging a robbery with the intent to collect a police report to be used to claim insurance. The football match actually plays a silent role in the movie showing how the policemen are engrossed in the game and care little for the loss of the tourist.

External links
Official site

2005 films
2005 comedy films
German comedy films
2000s German films